
Year 349 (CCCXLIX) was a common year starting on Sunday (link will display the full calendar) of the Julian calendar. At the time, it was known as the Year of the Consulship of Limenius and Catullinus (or, less frequently, year 1102 Ab urbe condita). The denomination 349 for this year has been used since the early medieval period, when the Anno Domini calendar era became the prevalent method in Europe for naming years.

Events 
 By place 

Asia
  After a brief reign of 183 days, Emperor Shi Zun and his mother Empress Zheng Yingtao are executed; his son Shi Jian succeeds him, as emperor of the Jie state Later Zhao. 
 The Mou-jong (proto-Mongols) take control of North China.

Births 
 John Chrysostom, archbishop of Constantinople (approximate date)

Deaths 
 Empress Liu, wife of Emperor Shi Hu (b. 318)
 Shi Hu, emperor of the Jie state Later Zhao (b. 295)
 Shi Shi, emperor and brother of Shi Zun (b. 339)
 Shi Zun, emperor of the Jie state Later Zhao
 Wei Shuo, calligrapher of the Jin Dynasty (b. 272)
 Empress Zhang, wife of emperor Shi Zun
 Empress Zheng Yingtao, mother of emperor Shi Zun

References